Politika is a Serbian newspaper.

Politika may also refer to:

Arts, media and entertainment
 Politika a.d., a Serbian media corporation, owner of several media outlets
 RTV Politika, a former Serbian TV station
 Politics (Aristotle) (Greek: Politiká), a work of political philosophy by Aristotle
 "Politika", a novel in the series Tom Clancy's Power Plays
 Tom Clancy's Politika, a Risk-like game for the PC

See also
 Polityka, a Polish newsmagazine
 Politics (disambiguation)
 Policy (disambiguation)